The Dravidian University, Kuppam, Andhra Pradesh, India was established by the Government of Andhra Pradesh, through a Legislature Act (No. 17 of 1997) with the initial support extended by the governments of Tamil Nadu, Karnataka and Kerala for an integrated development of Dravidian languages and culture. It was the brainchild of former Chief Minister N.T. Rama Rao.

Dravidian University offers undergraduate, postgraduate, and doctoral programs in a variety of subjects, including Dravidian Languages, Linguistics, Literature, History, Philosophy, Folklore, Tribal Studies, Sociology, Anthropology, Education, and Computer Science.  

The university follows a semester system, with two semesters per year. The duration of the undergraduate programs is typically three years, while the postgraduate programs are of two years.  

The university also offers distance education programs for those who are unable to attend regular classes.

Vice-chancellors
Following are the former vice-chancellors of the university:
 P. V. Arunachalam, 1997–2001
 R. Srihari, 2001–2005
 K.S. Chalam, May 2005
 S.Jayarama Reddy, June–August 2005
 G. Lakshmi Narayana, 2005–2008
 C. Rathnam, August 2008 (I/c)
 Cuddapah Ramanaiah, 2008–2011
 N. Prabhakar Rao, August 2011 – November 2011 (I/c)
 M.G. Gopal, November 2011 – December 2011 (I/c)
 S. Chellappa, December 2011 – February 2012 (I/c)
 M.G. Gopal, February–April 2012 (I/c)
 K. Rathnaiah, 2012–2015
 P. Vijaya Prakash, April–October 2015 (I/c)
 E. Sathyanarayana, 2015–2018
 Rokkam Sudarsan Rao, October 2018 – January 2019 (I/c)
 Sudhakar Yedla, January–September 2019
 G. Lokanadha Reddy, September 2019 – May 2020

References

External links

 

Dravidian studies
Universities and colleges in Chittoor district
Educational institutions established in 1997
1997 establishments in Andhra Pradesh
State universities in Andhra Pradesh